The Passage (1930) is a novel by Australian author Vance Palmer. It won the ALS Gold Medal for Best Novel in 1930.

Plot summary

The novel is set in a small fishing village on the coast of Queensland, known as "The Passage", and centres around the affairs of the Callaways, original pioneers in the area. The tranquility of this unspoilt, idyllic location is endangered by Vic Osborne, a developer who threatens to bring the urban world to "The Passage".

Notes
 Dedication: To Nettie Palmer
 The novel was serialised in The Bulletin magazine in weekly installments from 16 April to 30 June 1930.

Reviews

 John K. Ewers, writing in The West Australian stated that "The author has sliced a portion out of the coast of Queensland and given it permanence...the characters live in the atmosphere of The Passage. The book is soaked with it. Long association with the water has identified them with the marine life. Their thoughts are coloured by their relation to it. There are, too, many memorable and beautiful pictures of the seascape, the ocean in its varying moods, the sky, the sun, the work among the mullet, all of which leave the reader with an impression of actual contact."
 In a profile of the author, three years after the book's publication, a writer in The Age noted that with this book "he gave the world a glorious piece of smooth and faultless narrative, enriched and embellished by a wealth of incident and scene, the telling of which rivals some of the best descriptive passages in English prose."

Awards and nominations
 1929 winner Bulletin Novel Competition
 1930 winner ALS Gold Medal

References

1930 Australian novels
ALS Gold Medal winning works
Stanley Paul books